Marion Rung (born 7 December 1945 in Helsinki) is a Finnish pop singer. She is known for having represented Finland in the Eurovision Song Contest in 1962 and 1973. Her 1962 Eurovision song placed 7th, and in 1973, she managed to bring Finland's second best result in the contest until 2006 by finishing in 6th place. She also won the Grand Prix of the Sopot International Song Festival in 1974 and the Intervision Song Contest 1980 with "Where is the Love."

Life 
Rung started her career in 1961, when she placed second in a Finnish song contest. The success gave her a chance to record her first single Brigitte Bardot. Her most famous schlagers include "Tipi-tii", "El Bimbo" and "Eviva Espanja." In the 1970s, she also became well known in Germany. She continued her career, and in 2000, she was one fourth of the Leidit lavalla line-up with Katri Helena, Paula Koivuniemi, and Lea Laven. 

Rung's mother tongue is Swedish, and she has appeared in Swedish radio and television. In 1962, she made a show at the famous Swedish live music bar Hamburger börs in Stockholm and also made records in Swedish.

During the 1970s, she recorded five singles in Germany 1975-79, and the most successful, El Bimbo sold 100 000 copies. She also made an LP in English, Love is... in 1978.

Marion Rung won "Syksyn Sävel" ("Tune of Autumn") at schlager Finnish song festival in 1977, as the first woman so far, with the song "Rakkaus on hellyyttä" (Love is affection) and in 1974 and 1980 she won the Sopot International Song Festival.

She celebrated 45 years on stage 2005 with concerts in Savoy-teather, Helsinki. The same year a 4CD- collection "Shalom,rakkaimmat lauluni" (Shalom, my favorite songs) was released as well as her biography "Minä ja Marion" ("Me and Marion"). She also played the leading role in the musical Annie get your gun. In 2009 Rung received a golden record of the album "Elämänvoimaa" (Vitality).

From 1961 to 2015, Marion Rung made almost 100 singles and 24 albums.

Personal life
Rung is of Russian Jewish origin.

Stamp
Rung is shown on a stamp.

Selected discography
Singles
 Tom Tom Tom / My Son John 1973
 El Bimbo (Hal Shaper, Morgan) / Go Your Way (Henriksson, Robson) 1975 EMI Finland
 Baby Face / Totuuteen (Tu T'en Vas) 	1976
 Kylähäät (Ballerino) / Leikki Kaukana On, Gino (Es War Mehr Als Ein Spiel, Gino) 1976

See also
 List of best-selling music artists in Finland

References

External links

 Marion Rung's English-language home page: history and discography
 The Cold War rival to Eurovision, Steve Rosenberg, BBC News Magazine, 13 May 2012. Retrieved 2012-05-17.

1945 births
Sopot International Song Festival winners
Living people
20th-century Finnish women singers
Finnish Jews
Jewish singers
Singers from Helsinki
Finnish people of Russian-Jewish descent
Eurovision Song Contest entrants for Finland
Eurovision Song Contest entrants of 1962
Eurovision Song Contest entrants of 1973
Finnish expatriates in West Germany
Swedish-speaking Finns